Skin Game is a 1971 American independent comedy western directed by Paul Bogart and Gordon Douglas, and starring James Garner and Lou Gossett. The supporting cast features Susan Clark, Edward Asner, Andrew Duggan, Parley Baer and Royal Dano.

Plot 
Quincy Drew (Garner) and Jason O'Rourke (Gossett) travel from town to town in the south of the United States during the slavery era. A flashback in the movie shows both men first met when Quincy sold Jason a horse that turned out to have been stolen from the local sheriff. They meet again in jail after pulling various con jobs and develop a con together in which Quincy claims to be a down-on-his-luck slave owner who is selling his only slave, who is Jason. Quincy gets the bidding rolling, selling Jason, and the two later meet up to split the profit. Jason was born a free man in New Jersey and is very well educated. The con is complicated by Jason being sold to a slave trader who is very savvy and intent on taking him down south to make a profit.

Cast 
 James Garner as Quincy Drew / Captain Nathaniel Mountjoy
 Lou Gossett as Jason O'Rourke
 Susan Clark as Ginger / Miss Abigail Blodgett
 Brenda Sykes as Naomi, Slave
 Edward Asner as Plunkett (runaway slave hunter)
 Andrew Duggan as Howard Calloway, Plantation Owner
 Henry Jones as Sam Cutler, Slave Buyer In Fair Shake
 Neva Patterson as Mrs. Claggart
 Parley Baer as Mr. Claggart
 George Tyne as Henry P. Bonner, Man Who Bought Jason In Dirty Shame
 Royal Dano as John Brown, Abolitionist
 Pat O'Malley as William, Slave Buyer In Fair Shake
 Joel Fluellen as Uncle Abram, Head Slave At Calloway Manor
 Napoleon Whiting as Ned, Calloway Cook
 Juanita Moore as Viney, Calloway Slave
 Robert Foulk as Sheriff

Production
In January 1966 Harry Keller, a producer at Universal, announced he was developing the project based on a story by Richard Alan Simmons.

In March 1968 Peter Stone signed to write the script. In October 1968 Universal announced the film for the following year.

In April 1969 Universal put the film on its slate for the following year. Keller would produce with Peter Stone, who wrote the script.

The film did not go ahead. By September 1970 Keller announced the film would be made by James Garner's Cherokee Productions, releasing through Warner Bros with Burt Kennedy to direct. By December Kennedy had dropped out and was replaced by Paul Bogart.

In January 1971 Lou Gosset signed to co star.

In March Bogart fell ill with hepatitis and Gordon Douglas took over directing for a period of filming.

Stone later claimed Garner radically changed the last third of the film to give him more screentime. These changes annoyed Stone who used a pseudonym on the film.

Garner called it "a funny movie if you don't mind jokes about slavery. Paul Bogart did a masterly job."

Sequel 
A sequel was made three years later as a television film called Sidekicks, with Larry Hagman playing Garner's role and Gossett reprising his part.

References

External links
 
 
 James Garner Interview on the Charlie Rose Show
 James Garner interview at Archive of American Television - (c/o Google Video) - March 17, 1999

1971 films
Films directed by Gordon Douglas
1971 comedy films
American independent films
Films set in the 1850s
Films directed by Paul Bogart
Films scored by David Shire
1970s English-language films
1970s American films
African-American Western (genre) films